Kylin may refer to:
 Qilin or Kylin, a mythical creature known in various East Asian cultures
 Kylin (operating system), a Chinese operating system
 Apache Kylin, an open-source distributed analytics engine
 Kylin Villa, a place near University Town of Shenzhen, Guangdong, China
 Bayi Kylin, a professional basketball team in Women's Chinese Basketball Association
 Shaanxi Gaitianli Kylins, a defunct professional basketball team in the Chinese Basketball Association
 Kylin TV, an internet television channel owned by Phoenix North America Chinese Channel
 Kylin, a model of Mitsubishi pickups by Changfeng Motor

People with the surname
 Ann-Sofie Kylin (born 1955), Swedish actress starring in the 1970 film A Swedish Love Story
 Johann Harald Kylin (1879-1949), Swedish botanist

See also
 Kirin (disambiguation)
 Qilin (disambiguation)